San Asensio de los Cantos is a village in the municipality of Ojacastro, in the province and autonomous community of La Rioja, Spain. As of 2018, it had a population of 1 person.

References

Populated places in La Rioja (Spain)